RFL League One (for sponsorship reasons currently known as the Betfred League One) is a professional rugby league competition based in the United Kingdom. Part of the British rugby league pyramid, the competition features clubs from England and Wales, and has previously included clubs from Canada and France. It is the Rugby Football League's (RFL) third-tier competition, below the Championship, with which it has promotion and relegation.

The league was inaugurated in 2003 when the Northern Ford Premiership was divided into two separate leagues, initially named National League One and National League Two. In 2009, the league names were changed to the Championship and Championship 1 respectively, with the latter adopting its current name of League One in 2015.

History

1991–2003: Foundation and regular competition
Third-division rugby league competitions in the United Kingdom have existed periodically since 1991. The current incarnation was created in 2003 when the second-division competition below Super League, the Northern Ford Premiership, was split into National Leagues One and Two. Teams that finished in the top ten league positions of the Northern Ford Premiership at the end of the 2002 season formed National League One, while the remaining eight formed National League Two where they were joined by two additional clubs, London Skolars from the Rugby League Conference and York City Knights, who replaced the defunct York Wasps and also joined National League Two for the inaugural season in 2003.

2004–2009: National Leagues
At the end of the 2005 Super League season, an extra team was relegated to National League One in order to accommodate French side Catalans Dragons' entry to the competition. In turn, an additional team was relegated from National League One to League Two, while Blackpool Panthers were elected to National League Two for the 2005 season to replace the defunct Chorley Lynx, leaving 11 teams in League Two. In order to even up the numbers, the Welsh team Celtic Crusaders were admitted to the competition in 2005, first playing in the 2006 season and increasing the division to twelve teams.

2010–2014: Championship 1
In 2009 Super League was expanded to 14 teams, with two additional teams being promoted from National League One. In turn, two additional teams were promoted from National League Two to National League One at the end of the 2008 season, reducing the number of teams in National League Two to 10. National Leagues One and Two were then rebranded as Championship and Championship 1 respectively, with the change being implemented in time for the 2009 season.

South Wales Scorpions were admitted to Championship 1 for the 2010 season, increasing the number of teams in the league to 11. Blackpool Panthers left the league in 2011, once again reducing the number of teams to 10. In 2013, three new teams were admitted to the league; Hemel Stags, Gloucestershire All Golds and Oxford Rugby League. To facilitate this expansion, in 2012 four teams were promoted to the Championship from Championship 1 and no teams were relegated from the Championship, meaning that the 2013 Championship 1 season was contested by 9 teams.

2015–present: League 1
In 2014 expansion and restructure took place with 5 teams relegated from the Championship and Coventry Bears added to expand the league to 14 teams, which was then renamed League 1. A new playoff structure was also introduced with two teams being promoted to the Championship. In 2015 the League 1 Cup was introduced as an additional competition for League 1 clubs. In 2016 Toulouse Olympique joined the league, bringing the total number of teams to 15. Toronto Wolfpack joined the league in 2017, bringing the total number of teams to 16.

In 2016, the Super 8s format that had been used in the Super League and Championship was introduced to League 1.

Under the amended structure, the 16 League 1 clubs play a regular season of 15 rounds, playing each other once either home or away. Following the conclusion of their regular league seasons, the 16 clubs then compete in a playoff series where they split into 2 divisions of 8 based upon league position:
 The top eight League 1 clubs compete in the League 1 Super 8s. They play each other once (either home or away) to determine the champion and the four clubs that will compete in the playoffs for the second promotion place.
 The remaining clubs compete for the League 1 Shield.

This format remained in use for the 2017 season but on 26 October 2017, it was confirmed that Oxford Rugby League and Gloucestershire All Golds will not compete for the 2018 season, in favour of creating a merged club in Bristol for 2019.  This reduces the number of clubs to 14 and for 2018 the Super 8 format has been discarded and instead the teams will play a 26-game season; with home and away fixtures against all the other teams.  The club top of the table after 26 games will automatically be promoted to the Championship and those finishing second to fifth will play off for the other promotion spot.

The format was modified for 2019 following an RFL extraordinary general meeting in September 2018.  The number of clubs in the division will be reduced to 12 and the top six teams will compete for two promotion places to the Championship. However, on 23 October 2018, Hemel Stags announced that the club was withdrawing from the league for 2019 reducing the number of teams to 11; the RFL indicated that no replacement team is to be sought for the time being.  The team finishing top of the 11-team league after the 20-game regular season will automatically be promoted then a series of six further matches will decide the second promotion spot.

Following the aborted 2020 season, the number of clubs was reduced to 10 as Newcastle Thunder were appointed to the Championship and the planned entry of Ottawa Aces was deferred to 2022.  Over the close season of 2021–2022 Ottawa Aces decided to relocate to Cornwall and Cornwall R.L.F.C. became the divisions eleventh team for 2022.

A reduction to ten teams happened for 2023 as West Wales Raiders withdrew from the league in December 2022.

Clubs

*capacity for Rugby League games may differ from official stadium capacity.

Structure
Teams play each other once home and away in a round robin system. There is no relegation from League 1. At the end of the season the team finishing first is promoted to the Championship.  Various systems have been used to decide the second team to promote, the current system - in use since 2019 - is for the teams finishing between 2nd and 6th compete in a playoff competition to decide the second promotion spot.

In the play-offs first round there are two matches; the Elimination Final (EF) between the clubs finishing fifth and sixth, and the Qualifying Final (QF) between the clubs finishing third and fourth.  For the losing team of the Elimination Final the season is over but the other three play in the semi-finals of the play-offs.  In the semi-finals the 1st semi-final will be between the winning team in the EF and the losing team in the QF; while the 2nd semi-final will be between the team who finished second in the regular season (and had a bye in the first round of the play-offs) and the winning team of the QF. The team winning the 2nd semi-final will have home advantage in the Grand Final while the losing team will have home advantage in the Preliminary Final.  The team losing the 1st semi-final will be out of the competition while the winning team will play the team losing the 2nd semi-final in the Preliminary Final.  The winner of the Preliminary Final will play the winner of the 2nd semi-final in the League 1 Grand Final where the victorious team will take the second promotion spot to the Championship.

Results

Winners

Match officials

All rugby league matches are governed by the laws set out by the RFL; these laws are enforced by match officials. Former Super League and International Referee Steve Ganson is the current  Head of the Match Officials Department and Technical Director.

Sponsor

League One has had four different sponsors four times since 2003. Betfred are the current title sponsors.

The official rugby ball supplier is Steeden.

Expansion

The current RFL policy is to add expansion teams to the professional structure via entry to League 1. In 2011, the RFL invited expressions of interest for four additional British teams to join the competition starting in 2013. Of the 16 interested parties, three teams, University of Gloucestershire All Golds, Hemel Stags and Oxford Rugby League were accepted to join the league and began play in 2013, a fourth, the Northampton Town F.C.-linked Northampton Rebels were also accepted, but ultimately decided not to proceed. 
An additional team, Coventry Bears (now the Midlands Hurricanes), were also accepted in September 2012, however it was decided that they would join from the 2014 season to give them additional time to prepare. Coventry again deferred their membership in 2014, eventually joining the league for the 2015 season.

In 2015 it was announced that Toulouse Olympique, after talks with the RFL, had accepted the proposal to rejoin the English league structure in League 1 for the 2016 season, airing their aims for promotion in their maiden League 1 season in a bid to eventually achieve Super League status. They currently play in the Championship, having earned promotion at their first opportunity in 2016.

In 2016, it was announced that Toronto Wolfpack would be joining the league from the 2017 season, becoming the first team to compete in the RFL structure from outside of the UK or France. The Wolfpack won the League 1 title in their inaugural season and now play in the Super League.

In October 2017 it was announced that Gloucestershire All Golds and Oxford would withdraw from the league, merge and relocate the new club to Bristol with the intention of rejoining the league for the 2019 season, however this did not eventuate and in 2019 the All Golds entered the relaunched Conference League South. In addition Hemel Stags announced their withdrawal from League 1 at the end of the 2018 season in order to rejoin the Conference League South. In March 2019 it was announced that Hemel's RFL membership had been bought by a consortium including Toronto Wolfpack founder Eric Perez, with the intention of relocating the club to Ottawa, Canada. The club would ultimately be based in Cornwall and be called Cornwall R.L.F.C. A bid to establish a team in New York was also formally considered by the RFL in March 2019. There has also been expressions of interest in joining the RFL system from Spain and Serbia through Valencia Huracanes and Red Star Belgrade RL.

Media

TV
League 1 games in the past have been televised rarely and sporadically. Matches were previously broadcast in the UK on Premier Sports, however as of 2015 the competition does not receive television coverage. The newest member of the league, Toronto Wolfpack, has announced before the 2017 season that all of their games will be shown live on Canadian channel GameTV, as well as digitally on CBC Sports.

Radio
Regional radio stations, including BBC Local Radio and local commercial stations, provide coverage of the League 1 clubs.

See also

 Rugby League Championships
 British rugby league system
 Super League
 National Conference League
 Northern Ford Premiership
 National League Cup
 Rugby Football League Championship Third Division

References

External links

 
RFL Championship coverage
Scores from Sky Sports
The League 1 show (podcast)

 
Sports leagues established in 2003
2003 establishments in England
Rugby league competitions in the United Kingdom
Professional sports leagues in the United Kingdom
Professional sports leagues in France
Professional sports leagues in Canada
Multi-national professional sports leagues